Marilyn Strickland (born September 25, 1962) is an American politician who is the U.S. representative from Washington's 10th congressional district. The district is based in the state capital of Olympia, and also includes much of eastern Tacoma.

A member of the Democratic Party, Strickland took office on January 3, 2021. She served as the 38th mayor of Tacoma from 2010 to 2018. She is the first member of the United States Congress of both Korean and African-American heritage, and the first African-American member elected from Washington. Strickland is also one of the first three Korean-American women elected to Congress, beginning her term on the same day as Republicans Young Kim and Michelle Steel.

Early life and education 
Strickland was born on September 25, 1962, in Seoul, South Korea, the daughter of Inmin Kim, a Korean, and Willie Strickland, an African-American serviceman. She and her family moved to Tacoma, Washington, in 1967 after her father was stationed at Fort Lewis. She was raised in Tacoma's South End neighborhood and attended Mount Tahoma High School. Strickland earned a degree in business from the University of Washington and an MBA from Clark Atlanta University.

Career 
After graduating from the University of Washington, Strickland took a job at Northern Life Insurance doing clerical work. At a luncheon, she was introduced to Seattle Mayor Norm Rice, who suggested that she further her education.
 
After earning a Master of Business Administration from Clark Atlanta University, Strickland joined Starbucks as a manager of its online business. She then moved on to help launch the City of Tacoma’s public broadband cable service Click!, working with an advertisement agency to help grow public support.

After years in the private sector, Strickland was elected to the Tacoma City Council. She served as a council member for two years before being selected to serve as mayor from 2010 to 2018.

Strickland was the first Asian-born elected mayor of Tacoma, as well as the first African-American woman in that office. She used connections in China and Vietnam to draw foreign investors, culminating in Chinese President Xi Jinping's visit to Tacoma.

In May 2010, the Tacoma Board of Ethics sanctioned Strickland for accepting frequent flyer miles from a local businessman for an official trip to Asia. She accepted the sanction and returned the value of the frequent flyer miles to the businessman.

After her mayoralty, Strickland was approached by the pro-business Seattle Metropolitan Chamber of Commerce to serve as its president. During her tenure as president of the chamber of commerce, she opposed the Seattle head tax.

Strickland has been described as a political moderate or centrist.

U.S. House of Representatives

Elections

2020 

Strickland left the Chamber in early 2020, declaring her candidacy for Washington's 10th congressional district in the 2020 election, a seat being vacated by incumbent Denny Heck. She was endorsed by several politicians and newspapers. In the August 4 jungle primary, Strickland placed first in a field of 19 candidates. She and the second-place finisher, Democratic State Representative Beth Doglio, advanced to the November general election.

In the November general election, Strickland defeated Doglio. She assumed office on January 3, 2021. As a member of the 117th United States Congress, Strickland is the Pacific Northwest's first Black U.S. Representative and one of the first three Korean-American Congresswomen, along with Michelle Steel and Young Kim, who began their terms on the same day. She wore a traditional hanbok to her swearing-in ceremony to honor her mother.

Tenure

Committee assignments 
 United States House Committee on Armed Services
 Committee on Transportation and Infrastructure

Caucus memberships 
 Congressional Asian Pacific American Caucus
 Congressional Black Caucus
 New Democrat Coalition

Personal life 
Like many of her fellow Korean Americans and most other African-American Christian members of the U.S. Congress, Strickland is a Protestant.

See also 
 List of African-American United States representatives
 List of Asian Americans and Pacific Islands Americans in the United States Congress
 List of foreign-born United States politicians
 List of Korean Americans
 List of United States representatives from Washington
 Women in the United States House of Representatives

References

External links 

 Representative Marilyn Strickland official U.S. House website
Campaign website

|-

|-

1962 births
21st-century American politicians
21st-century American women politicians
African-American mayors in Washington (state)
African-American members of the United States House of Representatives
African-American people in Washington (state) politics
American mayors of Korean descent
American women of Korean descent in politics
Asian-American people in Washington (state) politics
Clark Atlanta University alumni
Democratic Party members of the United States House of Representatives from Washington (state)
Female members of the United States House of Representatives
Living people
Mayors of Tacoma, Washington
Asian-American members of the United States House of Representatives
People from Seoul
Women mayors of places in Washington (state)
University of Washington alumni
Women city councillors in Washington (state)
African-American city council members
African-American Christians
American Protestants
Christians from Washington (state)
Protestants from Washington (state)
South Korean emigrants to the United States
21st-century African-American women
21st-century African-American politicians
20th-century African-American people
20th-century African-American women
African-American women mayors